The Toyota Etios is a subcompact car consisting a line of four-door saloon/sedan and five-door hatchback produced by the Japanese automaker Toyota since 2010. The saloon version was launched in December 2010 and the hatchback version (with additional "Liva" and "Valco" suffixes in India and Indonesia respectively) followed in June 2011. The vehicle is built on the EFC platform.

The Etios has been produced in India (between 2010 and 2020), Brazil (since 2012, export only since 2021) and Indonesia (between 2013 and 2017). It has also been exported to other countries such as South Africa and several Latin American markets.

The name Etios is derived from Greek word ethos, meaning 'spirit', 'character' and 'ideals'. The Liva suffix is derived from the development concept phrase "live your life", while Valco is coined from terms value and comfort.



Overview 
The Etios Concept saloon with 1.5-litre petrol engine and Etios Concept hatchback with 1.2-litre petrol engine were unveiled in 10th Auto Expo automobile show in New Delhi.

During the development phase, the Etios was codenamed "EFC" (Entry Family Car). Originally, the Etios was planned to be built on the Yaris platform, however a low-cost platform derived from the NBC platform called the EFC platform was used instead. Aimed as the rival to the Dacia/Renault Logan, the vehicle is centered around India and Brazil as the manufacturing base. Toyota invested $350 million building a second plant in India to produce the Etios, with an initial annual production capacity of around 100,000 vehicles.  The actual commercial production started in December 2010. In May 2012, the Etios series reached total sales of 100,000 units in India. By 2013, the Indian version was localised to more than 90% of its parts.

As of 2022, the Etios sedan has the largest boot in its segment in Argentina (562 litres). It is bigger than the one in the Toyota Corolla (470 litres).

Since its introduction, the Etios has been updated three times, in March 2013, November 2014 and September 2016. No changes to the overall design were made, but there were changes to the interiors, front fascia and taillamps.

Indian production stopped in March 2020 there as the Bharat Stage 6 went into effect in April. Since Toyota had no interest to upgrade the Etios to meet the updated emissions standards, it was replaced by the more upmarket XP150 series Yaris saloon and the Suzuki Baleno-based Glanza hatchback as Toyota's subcompact car offering in the country. The Etios is also discontinued in Brazil in April 2021, but the production continues for export markets with 620,000 units made in Brazil up to March 2021. The XP150 series Yaris would assume the role of Toyota's entry-level car in the region.

Engines 
The petrol engines and transmissions are made locally at Toyota Kirloskar Auto Parts (TKAP), Bidadi, Karnataka, India.

Petrol (India)

Diesel (India)

Flex-fuel 
The saloon and hatchback models sold in Brazil are built with a flexible-fuel engine optimised to run with ethanol blends from E20/E25 to neat hydrous ethanol (E100).

Etios Xclusive editions 
The Etios Xclusive is a version of Etios G and Liva G respectively for Indian market, with dual-tone cream and beige coloured interiors, Bluetooth-equipped audio system, rear parking sensors, higher quality seat fabric, a chrome cap on the gear knob, and an "Xclusive" badge on the boot lid.

An updated version of the Etios Xclusive was released in 2015 with a touchscreen infotainment system and a wood grain finish on the instrument panel. It is based on the VX and VXD trims.

Etios Cross 
The Etios Cross is a crossover-inspired version based on the Liva. It was launched in 2014.

Motorsport 
Toyota India started a one-make racing series in India called the Etios Motor Racing. The series started in 2012 and witnessed an overwhelming response from the Indian youngsters, there were 3,300 applicants. After a 3-round selection procedure, Toyota held 2 rounds of exhibition races in 2012, one at a purpose built race track in Chennai called the Sriperumbudur race track and other in the form of ROC (Race of Champions) in Gurgaon. The 25 selected drivers competed in the main championship held in the later half of 2013. The cars are prepared by Red Rooster Performance based in Bangalore and designed by Toyota Racing Development (TRD).

Etios R5 

The Etios R5 is a R5 rally car built by Toyota Gazoo Racing Paraguay. It is based upon the Etios road car and was launched in 2016.

Safety 
The Etios has front ventilated disc brakes.

The Indian-market Etios and Etios Liva come with an immobiliser and door ajar warning as standard across all trims with dual SRS airbags, ABS and EBD available only on the G+, V and VX trims. Without ABS, it had earned a 4-star adult occupant and 3-star child occupant safety rating from Global NCAP in 2016.

The Brazilian Etios in its most basic Latin American configuration with 2 airbags had earned a 4-star adult occupant and 2-star child occupant safety rating from Latin NCAP in 2012. In 2019 (stricter from 2010–2015 protocols), both parameters earned 4-star safety rating for the newer version in its most basic Latin American configuration with 2 airbags.

Gallery

Sales 

† Not including the imported sedan which was used for taxis

References

External links 

  (Argentina, saloon)
  (Argentina, hatchback)

Etios
Cars introduced in 2010
2020s cars
Subcompact cars
Sedans
Hatchbacks
Front-wheel-drive vehicles
Global NCAP superminis
Latin NCAP superminis